Deegan is an Irish surname. Notable people with the surname include:

 Andrew Deegan (born 1995), Australian rugby player
 Bill Deegan (born 1935), American baseball umpire
 Brian Deegan (lawyer) (born 1955), Australian political activist
 Brian Deegan (rider) (born 1974), American motorcycle racer
 Denise Deegan (born 1952), English novelist and playwright
 Donna Deegan (born 1961), American journalist
 Dummy Deegan (1874–1957), American baseball player
 Gary Deegan (born 1987), Irish footballer
 Gene A. Deegan (born 1936), American major general
 Hailie Deegan (born 2001), American racing driver
 Marilyn Deegan, British scientist and historian
 Max Deegan (born 1996), Irish rugby player
 Mick Deegan (born 1964), Irish football manager
 Mike Deegan, British healthcare chief executive
 Millie Deegan (1919–2002), American baseball player
 Paddy Deegan (born 1995), Irish hurler
 Patricia Deegan, American psychologist
 Peter Deegan (born 1970), American attorney
 Robert P. Deegan, American academic administrator
 Tim Deegan, Canadian video jockey
 William Francis Deegan (1882–1932), American architect and engineer

See also
 Degan (surname)
 Major Deegan Expressway – named after William Francis Deegan
 Prunella Deegan character from the PBS Kids television show Arthur

Surnames of Irish origin
Anglicised Irish-language surnames